200 000 Taler is an opera by Boris Blacher after Sholem Aleichem's story "Dos groijse Gewins" (The big win) about tailor Schimele Soroker and his family after he comes to great fortune by winning the lottery. The opera was premiered at the Deutsche Oper Berlin on 25 September 1969.

Roles
Schimele Soroker, a tailor (baritone)
Ettie-Mennie, his wife (mezzo-soprano)
Bailke, his daughter (soprano)
Motel, assistant (tenor)
Kopel, assistant (baritone)
Perl, neighbor (soprano)
Solomon, landlord (bass)
Koltun, businessman (baritone)
Solovejchik, matchmaker (tenor)
Himmelfarb, bank clerk (tenor)
Mendel, domestic worker (bass)
Reb Ascher Fein, a rich man (mime artist)
Golda, his wife (pantomime)

Recordings
 1970 Martha Mödl, Günter Reich, Dorothea Weiß. Orchester der Deutschen Oper Berlin conducted by Heinrich Hollreiser, director Gustav Rudolf Sellner. Arthaus DVD. Recording of the premiere production

References

1969 operas
Operas by Boris Blacher
German-language operas
Operas based on literature
Operas